Ganeshthan is a Hindu temple located at Bharatpur Ward No. 11 in the Chitwan District of Nepal.

It is believed that the original structure of the temple was built in the fifteenth century by Muni Makunda, King of Palap. The modern temple was built in 1952, during the reign of King Mahendra. The Ganeshthan Temple (Baseni) is one of the most famous Hindu temples in the ancient city of Bharatpur, Nepal. Every Tuesday, people from different parts of Bharatpur come to pray to the Hindu deity Ganesha at the temple.

References

Hindu temples in Bagmati Province
15th-century establishments in Nepal
Buildings and structures in Bharatpur, Nepal